Sprout by HP (stylized as sprout) was a personal computer from HP Inc. announced on October 29, 2014 and released for sale on November 9, 2014. The system was conceived by Brad Short, a Distinguished Technologist at HP Inc., who along with Louis Kim co-founded and led a team within HP Inc. to develop and productize the computing concept. Former Apple Inc. employee, Eric Monsef, was also brought on to lead the Sprout team through a successful product launch.

Sprout has dual interactive touch screens: one a traditional LCD and the other a unique horizontally projected display called the "TouchMat", a thin flexible touch-sensitive mat just 2.5mm thin. The interactive screens are positioned in a novel inline orientation, one serving as a traditional PC display in front and above, the other serving as a unique interactive working surface on the table in front and below which displays digital content and serves as a 2D capture platen for scanning and re-projecting the scanned image in true scale. The signature integrated column and armature called the "Sprout Illuminator" is positioned above and behind the vertical display and houses a custom DLP projector, a high resolution camera, and a real-time depth sensor all aiming down at the thin flexible working surface of the TouchMat. Sprout's unique configuration and combination of interactive displays, cameras, and sensors enables immersive interactions that blend the physical and digital domains allowing, for example, documents and objects to co-exist with digital content projected on the TouchMat. The physical content can also be instantly 2D scanned or quickly 3D scanned and re-projected on the TouchMat (effectively converted from the physical domain to the digital domain) ready for digital manipulation in an intuitive manner as if working on paper with real objects. This functionality allows for seamless digital creation and remote collaboration using physical media and digital content blended together in a WYSIWYG manner, as well as providing traditional user inputs such as a projected virtual keyboard and a virtual trackpad. For additional user input, Sprout includes an Adonit stylus, as well as a Bluetooth-powered set of keyboard and mouse. This enables users to interact with physical and digital content while working. Content can be digitally captured and manipulated in 2D or 3D directly on the TouchMat interface.  HP claims that this greatly simplifies and streamlines the creative process.

Sprout Pro
2016's upgraded and re-designed version.

Sprout Pro gen2
2017's upgraded version; the last model of HP Sprout.

References

External links

Hewlett-Packard products
3D printing
Products introduced in 2014
2014 in computing
Hewlett-Packard All-in-one computers